Abdullah Iqbal (born 27 July 2002) is a footballer who currently plays for B.93 in the Danish 2nd Division. Born in Denmark, he represents the Pakistan national team.

Club career
Iqbal joined the youth academy of B.93 at the age of seven. He remained at the club until age fourteen before joining Brøndby IF for one year. Following his stint with the Superliga team, he returned to B.93 and eventually captained the under-19 side. He was promoted to the first team in 2021 and debuted in a 2–1 victory over Brabrand IF. Iqbal was then part of the squad that nearly earned promotion to the 1st Division in 2022 before ultimately falling short.

International career
Iqbal received his first senior international call-up for a friendly against Nepal on 16 November 2022. He went on to make his debut in the eventual 0–1 defeat.

International career statistics

Personal life
Iqbal was born in Denmark and is of Pakistani descent.

References

External links
Soccerway profile
National Football Teams profile
B.93 profile

Living people
2002 births
Pakistani footballers
Pakistan international footballers
Association football defenders